was a Japanese classical violinist and creator of the "Suzuki method".

Shinichi Suzuki or Shin'ichi Suzuki may also refer to:

, Japanese photographer
, Japanese photographer

See also
Shunichi Suzuki (disambiguation)